Yapraklı Dam is a dam in Turkey. The development was backed by the Turkish State Hydraulic Works.

Yaprakli Dam is a soil dam built on the Horzum Creek between 1985 and 1991 and was constructed for irrigation purposes. The volume of the dam, is 1.631.000 m³ and the dam wall is 70 meters from the river bed. The lake volume at normal water level is 112.95 hm³, the lake area at normal water level is 6.50 km2. The dam provides irrigation services to an area of 19,576 hectares.

See also
List of dams and reservoirs in Turkey

References

DSI directory, State Hydraulic Works (Turkey), Retrieved December 16, 2009

Dams in Burdur Province